Succha District is one of five districts in the Aija Province, of the Ancash Region in Peru. The capital of the district is Villa de Succha. Its population was 714 as of the 2017 census.

See also 
 Pillaka

References 

Districts of the Aija Province
Districts of the Ancash Region